Lina Boqvist (born 25 May 1991) is a Swedish professional golfer and member of the Ladies European Tour. In 2021 she won the Aramco Team Series – New York teamed with Jessica Korda and Karolin Lampert. She was runner-up at the 2019 Lalla Meryem Cup.

Career
Boqvist was born in 1991 in Gislaved, Småland, and learned the game at Isaberg Golf Club, home to the Gisvaled Ladies Open on the 1989 Ladies European Tour. As a junior, she collected multiple titles on the Skandia Tour and the Junior Masters Invitational series.

Boqvist turned professional ahead of the 2011 season and joined the Swedish Golf Tour, where she won the 2012 Swedish Matchplay Championship. Defending her title in 2013 she lost the final to Anjelika Hammar, but the runner-up finish helped her win the 2013 Swedish Golf Tour Order of Merit. She joined the 2014 LET Access Series and with a victory in the Onsjö Ladies Open she ended the season runner-up on the Order of Merit, earning her a card for the Ladies European Tour in 2015.

In her rookie season on the LET she made 12 appearances and finished 44th on the order of merit. Her best result of the 2015 season was a tie for third at Tipsport Golf Masters in the Czech Republic, three strokes behind Hannah Burke.

Boqvist made the cut in her first major appearance. She finished T47 in the 2016 Women's British Open at Woburn Golf and Country Club after qualifying by rising to 23rd on the LET money list, helped by a top ten at the Lalla Meryem Cup. She qualified as one of the five reserves for the 2016 Summer Olympics.

She finished fifth at the 2018 European Golf Team Championships - Mixed team together with Per Längfors, Johan Edfors and Emma Nilsson, two strokes away from the bronze medal playoff.

In 2019 Boqvist was runner-up at the Lalla Meryem Cup and moved up to fifth on the Order of Merit. She shot a career low round of 66 and finished the tournament tied for second to Nuria Iturrioz after they started the final round tied at 10-under. She finished the 2019 season 11th on the Order of Merit.

In 2021 she clinched her first LET victory in the team event at the Aramco Team Series – New York, teamed with Jessica Korda, Karolin Lampert and amateur Alexandra O'Laughlin, a Golf Channel reporter. After starting the day two strokes behind the overnight leaders, the team produced a solid round to finish with a total of 41-under-par forcing a playoff with the team captained by Sophia Popov.

In 2022, Boqvist rolled in eight birdies, including four consecutively from 15 to 18, to take the lead after the first round of the Women's Irish Open.

Amateur wins
2006 (1) Skandia Tour Småland #1
2008 (2) Skandia Tour Riks #6 - Skåne, Varberg Junior Open
2009 (3) Patrik Sjöland Junior Open, Varberg Junior Open, Skandia Tour Riks #8 - Halland
2010 (3) Gräppås Junior Open, Skandia Tour elit flickor #5, Junior Masters Invitational

Professional wins (3)

LET Access Series (1)

Swedish Golf Tour (2)
2012 Swedish Matchplay Championship
2017 Ulricehamn Ladies Open

Results in LPGA majors

CUT = missed the half-way cut
NT = no tournament
"T" = tied for place

Team appearances
Professional
European Championships (representing Sweden): 2018

References

External links

Swedish female golfers
Ladies European Tour golfers
Sportspeople from Jönköping County
People from Gislaved Municipality
1991 births
Living people
21st-century Swedish women